Annibale Bentivoglio (died 1663) was a Roman Catholic prelate who served as Titular Archbishop of Thebae (1645–1663) and Apostolic Nuncio to Florence (1645–1652).

Biography
Annibale Bentivoglio was born in Bologna, Italy.
On 6 March 1645, he was appointed during the papacy of Pope Innocent X as Titular Archbishop of Thebae.
On 19 March 1645, he was consecrated bishop by Alessandro Bichi, Bishop of Carpentras, with Alfonso Gonzaga, Titular Archbishop of Rhodus, and Giovanni de Torres, Titular Archbishop of Hadrianopolis in Haemimonto, serving as co-consecrators.
On 20 April 1645, he was appointed during the papacy of Pope Innocent X as Apostolic Nuncio to Florence.
In November 1652, he resigned as Apostolic Nuncio to Florence.
He served as Titular Archbishop of Thebae until his death on 21 April 1663 in Florence, Italy.

Episcopal succession

References

17th-century Roman Catholic titular bishops
Bishops appointed by Pope Innocent X
1663 deaths